İkinci Aral (also, Aral Vtoroye) is a village in the Agdash Rayon of Azerbaijan. The village forms part of the municipality of Birinci Aral.

References 

Populated places in Agdash District